Cheltenham Jazz Festival is one of the UK's leading jazz festivals, and is part of Cheltenham Festivals' annual festival season, also including the Science, Music and Literature Festivals in Cheltenham Spa.

Introduction and history

The Cheltenham Jazz Festival was started in 1996, under the direction of Jim Smith, and has established itself as one of the UK's most popular annual jazz festivals.  With a programme now developed by Tony Dudley-Evans and Festival Director Ian George, the Cheltenham Jazz Festival consists of a broad range of jazz in many guises. The next Cheltenham Jazz Festival will take place on 5–10 May 2020.

Previous artists

The Festival has presented a number of star names over the years, including Herbie Hancock, Ornette Coleman, Van Morrison, Jamie Cullum, Jools Holland, Laura Mvula, Eartha Kitt (in her last UK performance), Chick Corea, Maceo Parker, John Scofield, Gilles Peterson, the BBC Big Band, the Loose Tubes (in their first performance together in 20 years), Gregory Porter, Dave Holland, Wilko Johnson, Caro Emerald, Mr Scruff, Charles Lloyd, Silje Nergaard, Billy Cobham, Guillemots, Madeleine Peyroux, The Cinematic Orchestra, Curtis Stigers, The Nextmen, Bennie Maupin, Marti Pellow, Ben Allison, Michael Brecker, Dianne Reeves, The Claudia Quintet, Courtney Pine, Zoe Rahman, Cassandra Wilson, Martha Reeves, Benny Golson, Joe Zawinul, Adrian Adlam,  Archie Shepp, Lee Konitz and Ray Brown.

In previous years, the festival has also featured an artist in residence, and these have included:
 2004 John Taylor
 2005 Bobby Previte
 2006 Ken Vandermark
 2007 Bob Brookmeyer
 2012 Paloma Faith
 2013 Gregory Porter
 2014 Laura Mvula

The Fringe
As the festival grows so does its side line, The Fringe. Located in pubs, parks and restaurants around Cheltenham, The Fringe allows small bands and artists to show their talent and make a name for themselves. Many gigs are often free and enable people to get a little taster of what is going on in the jazz world, whilst significantly contributing to the festival vibe throughout the town. Many famous performers such as Jamie Cullum have played at The Fringe before becoming successful jazz musicians.

Education
A variety of workshops and ‘masterclasses’ are available to children, teenagers and adults throughout the festival. These have included popular band, drum and voice workshops, as well as advice from jazz musicians on performance and improvisation.

Venues
The events of Cheltenham Jazz Festival mainly take place in a tented village in Montpellier Gardens, including a Big Top, the Jazz Arena and a Free Stage surrounded by food traders, secret gardens and festival bars. Dinner concerts and some other performances are also played in other venues around town, such as the Playhouse Theatre, the Daffodil Restaurant, the Parabola Arts Centre of Cheltenham Ladies' College and Cheltenham Town Hall.

Festival history

2015

Big Names 
Caro Emerald, Sun Ra Arkestra, Rumer, Joe Lovano, Wilko Johnson, Martha Reeves & The Vandellas, John Scofield, Gregory Porter, Madeski Martin & Wood, Laura Mvula, Tony Allen, Average White Band, Gilles Peterson, GoGo Penguin, Bassekou Kouyate and Lee Konitz.

2014

Big Names 
Jools Holland, Jamie Cullum, Curtis Stigers, Robert Cray, Gregory Porter, Kurt Elling, Billy Cobham, Laura Mvula, Loose Tubes, Frank Sinatra Jnr., Nick Mulvey, Judith Owen, Tigran, Eska, Hailey Tuck, Gilles Peterson, Snarky Puppy, Natalie Williams and Julian Siegel.

2013

Big Names 
Van Morrison, Noisettes, Ravi Coltrane, the New Gary Burton Quartet, Gregory Porter, Madeleine Peyroux, Jamie Cullum, Georgie Fame, Claire Martin, Lianne La Havas, Laura Mvula and Dave Douglas.

2012

Big Names 
Paloma Faith, Jamie Cullum, Imelda May, Gregory Porter, The Puppini Sisters, Melody Gardot, Bill Frisell, Candi Staton and Marcus Miller.

2010

Big names
Jamie Cullum, Paloma Faith, Elaine Paige, Eric Bibb, Imelda May, Liane Carroll, Sir Michael Parkinson, Kit Downes and Mark Sanders Cuong Vu Trio

Barclays' title sponsorship 
In 2010, Barclays became the Cheltenham Jazz Festival's title sponsor.

2009

Big names
Hugh Masekela, Nigel Kennedy, BBC Big Band, The Souljazz Orchestra, Beardyman, Portico Quartet, Jack DeJohnette, Madeleine Peyroux, Robert Mitchell, Alex Wilson, Pat Martino, Dave Douglas, Don Byron, John Surman, Nikki Yeoh, BBC Concert Orchestra, Dave Liebman, Imelda May, Lea Delaria, and the Scratch Perverts.

Budvar's title sponsorship
After being previous partners with the Festival (as the 'official drink' in 2007, hosting the popular 'Budvar Jazz Marquee' and hosting the competition 'Budvar Brewed Jazz' in 2008), the year 2009 saw the Czech beer company Budvar successfully become the title sponsors of Cheltenham's Jazz Festival, making the full name "Budvar Cheltenham Jazz Festival".

2008

Big names
Eartha Kitt (in her last-ever UK performance), Cleo Laine, Maceo Parker, Carol Brewster, Dennis Rollins, John Dankworth, Ruby Turner, Imelda May, Courtney Pine, Bill Frisell, Jack DeJohnette, Van Morrison, Gilles Peterson, Jose James, the BBC Big Band, Elan Mehler, Roberto Fonseca, Nicola Conte, Tawiah, and Mr Scruff.

Jerwood Jazz Generation
The Jerwood Jazz Generation series is the result of a long-standing partnership between the Cheltenham Jazz Festival and the Jerwood Charitable Foundation to nurture the British Jazz legends of the future. Since 2002 the scheme has backed more than 50 young British artists who come to Cheltenham to premiere a new commission, launch a new band or for a valuable second outing of a new project.
The series has seen such rising stars as Bryan Corbett, Soweto Kinch, Ingrid Laubrock, Gwilym Simcock and Seb Rochford, and has produced landmark projects such as Denys Baptiste's Let Freedom Ring! and Abram Wilson's Ride! – Ferris Wheel to the Modern Day Delta.

Fringe artists
2008's ‘Fringe’ performers included:
Nia Lynn's 'The Bannau Trio', Le Tatou Bleu, Swing From Paris, Blue Soup, Monk's Milk, Strung Out, Clint Denyer, The Dave Greatrex trio, Joe Summers, Rokhsan Heydari, Peter Hopcroft Quartet, Step Change, Sam Wooster trio, Ricardo Gazzini, Alex Merritt Quartet, Aida severo, Xposed Club Performance, Edward Leaker Trio, Fat Digester, Moment's Notice, Tym Jozwiak, Adam Sanders Quintet, 8-Fold, Ben Bryden, Jamie Safiruddin Quartet, Espresso, Patsy Gamble, Salsa del sol, Andre Canniere, Tommy Charles Quartet, Melonious Funk, IPSO Facto, Big Brunch Band, Steve Franks & Janey Ross, Bunty and The Worm, Tom Bunting quartet, Gareth Roberts Quintet, Alcyona Mick Quintet, Free Spirits, Royal Oak Brass and The Indigo Kings.

Cheltenham festivals

Cheltenham Jazz Festival is one of the four festivals that Cheltenham Festivals run each year. Combined with the Science, Music and Literature Festivals, Cheltenham Festivals host over 800 events across 12 months.

References

External links
 Cheltenham Jazz Festival website

Jazz festivals in the United Kingdom
Jazz Festival
Music festivals in Gloucestershire
Recurring events established in 1996